Henryk Szost (born 20 January 1982 in Krynica Zdrój) is a Polish long-distance runner who competes in the marathon.

He twice competed in the marathon at the Olympics. He finished 34th in 2008 at the Beijing Games  and 9th in 2012 at the London Games.

He competed at the 2010 European Athletics Championships, but dropped out of the race. His personal best time of 2:07:39 hours set in 2012 is the Polish record for the event.

In 2012 he was runner-up at the Lake Biwa Marathon and came third at the Fukuoka Marathon.

Achievements

References

External links
 

1982 births
Living people
People from Krynica-Zdrój
Polish male long-distance runners
Polish male marathon runners
Athletes (track and field) at the 2008 Summer Olympics
Athletes (track and field) at the 2012 Summer Olympics
Olympic athletes of Poland
Sportspeople from Lesser Poland Voivodeship